Phytoecia incensoides is a species of beetle in the family Cerambycidae. It was described by Stephan von Breuning in 1978. It is known from Tanzania.

References

Endemic fauna of Tanzania
Phytoecia
Beetles described in 1978